Boris Ivanovitch Afanasiev (August 8, 1913 – 1983) was a Russian ice hockey goaltender, coach, and football player.

Career
Afanasiev was first a football player. He played for CDKA Moscow from 1929-1933. He then played for Dukat Moscow in 1933, for Dynamo Bolshevo from 1934-1937, and for Dynamo Kiev from 1938-1941. He later returned to CDKA Moscow from 1944-1948. He won the Soviet Cup with CDKA Moscow in 1945, before winning the Soviet Top League with them a year later. In total, he scored three goals in 93 games played in the Soviet Top League.

In 1948, after finishing his football career, Afanasiev began playing ice hockey. He won the Soviet Championship League with the CDKA Moscow hockey team in 1948, 1949, and 1950. He was CDKA's goaltender along with Grigory Mkrtychan. He was inducted into the Russian and Soviet Hockey Hall of Fame in 1948.

After ending his ice hockey career in 1953, Afanasiev became a coach.

References

External links

1913 births
1983 deaths
Soviet footballers
Association football midfielders
FC Dynamo Kyiv players
PFC CSKA Moscow players
Soviet ice hockey goaltenders
Soviet ice hockey coaches
HC CSKA Moscow players
Soviet expatriate sportspeople in Yugoslavia
Footballers from Moscow
Ice hockey people from Moscow
Russian footballers
Russian ice hockey goaltenders